Kim Yu-jae (Hangul: 김유재; born 12 June 2009) is a South Korean figure skater. She is the 2022 JGP France bronze medalist and 2022 South Korea junior silver medalist. She placed fourth at the 2023 World Junior Championships.

Personal life 
Kim was born on 12 June 2009 in Seoul. Her twin sister, Yu-seong, is a figure skater as well.

Career

Early years 
Kim began learning to skate in 2019. She won the silver medal at the 2022 South Korean Junior Championships at age 12.

2022–23 season 
Based on her junior national podium the previous year, Kim was sent to make her international junior debut on the Junior Grand Prix. Given one assignment, she won the bronze medal at the 2022 JGP France in Courchevel. Kim attempted a triple Axel in the free skate, a rarity among female skaters, landing it a quarter underrotated.

After finishing sixth at the 2023 South Korean Championships at the senior level, Kim was given one of three South Korean berths at the 2023 World Junior Championships in Calgary. She finished fourth in the short program with a new personal best, despite receiving a quarter underrotation call on her triple loop attempt. In the free skate, Kim successfully landed the triple Axel, and received only one quarter call on her other six triple jumps. She was fourth in that segment as well, finishing fourth overall. She indicated that she next goal would be to put two triple Axels in her free skate.

Programs

Competitive highlights 
JGP: Junior Grand Prix

References

External links 
 
 

2009 births
Living people
South Korean female single skaters
Sportspeople from Seoul
Figure skaters from Seoul
Twin sportspeople
South Korean twins